Shota Lomidze (20 January 1936 – 23 October 1993) was a Georgian wrestler who competed in the 1964 Summer Olympics and in the 1968 Summer Olympics.

References

1936 births
1993 deaths
Olympic wrestlers of the Soviet Union
Wrestlers at the 1964 Summer Olympics
Wrestlers at the 1968 Summer Olympics
Male sport wrestlers from Georgia (country)
Olympic silver medalists for the Soviet Union
Olympic medalists in wrestling
Medalists at the 1968 Summer Olympics
World Wrestling Champions
World Wrestling Championships medalists